Jacob Benjamin Gyllenhaal (born December 19, 1980) is an American actor. Born into the Gyllenhaal family, he is the son of director Stephen Gyllenhaal and screenwriter Naomi Foner, and his older sister is actress Maggie Gyllenhaal. He began acting as a child, making his acting debut in City Slickers (1991), followed by roles in his father's films A Dangerous Woman (1993) and Homegrown (1998). His breakthrough roles were as Homer Hickam in October Sky (1999) and as a psychologically troubled teenager in Donnie Darko (2001).

Gyllenhaal starred in the 2004 science fiction disaster film The Day After Tomorrow. He played Jack Twist in Ang Lee's 2005 romantic drama Brokeback Mountain, for which Gyllenhaal won a BAFTA Award and was nominated for an Academy Award. His career progressed with starring roles in the thriller Zodiac (2007), the romantic comedy Love & Other Drugs (2010), and the science fiction film Source Code (2011). Further acclaim came with his roles in Denis Villeneuve's thrillers Prisoners (2013) and Enemy (2013), and he received nominations for the BAFTA Award for Best Actor in a Leading Role for his performances as a manipulative journalist in Nightcrawler (2014) and a troubled writer in Nocturnal Animals (2016). His highest-grossing release came with the Marvel Cinematic Universe superhero film Spider-Man: Far From Home (2019), in which he portrayed Quentin Beck / Mysterio. He has since starred in Wildlife (2018), Velvet Buzzsaw (2018), The Guilty (2021), and Ambulance (2022).

Gyllenhaal has performed on stage, starring in a West End production of the play This Is Our Youth and Broadway productions of the musical Sunday in the Park with George as well as the plays Constellations and Sea Wall/A Life, the lattermost of which earned him a nomination for the Tony Award for Best Actor in a Play. Aside from acting, he is vocal about political and social issues.

Life and career

1980–2000: Early life and career beginnings

Jacob Benjamin Gyllenhaal was born on December 19, 1980, in Los Angeles, California, to film producer and screenwriter Naomi Foner (née Achs) and film director Stephen Gyllenhaal. Actress Maggie Gyllenhaal, his older sister, appeared with him in the film Donnie Darko. Gyllenhaal's father, who was raised as a Swedenborgian, is of Swedish and English descent and is a descendant of the Swedish noble Gyllenhaal family. His last ancestor to be born in Sweden was his great-great-grandfather, Anders Leonard Gyllenhaal. Gyllenhaal's mother is Jewish, and was born in New York City to an Ashkenazi Jewish family from Russia and Poland. Gyllenhaal has said that he considers himself Jewish. On his 13th birthday, Gyllenhaal performed a "Bar Mitzvah-like act, without the typical trappings", volunteering at a homeless shelter because his parents wanted to give him a sense of gratitude for his privileged lifestyle.

As a child, Gyllenhaal was regularly exposed to filmmaking due to his family's ties to the industry. He made his acting debut as Billy Crystal's son in the 1991 comedy City Slickers. His parents did not allow him to appear in The Mighty Ducks (1992) because it would have required him to leave home for two months. In subsequent years, his parents allowed him to audition for roles but regularly forbade him to take them if he were chosen. He was allowed to appear in his father's films several times. Gyllenhaal appeared in the 1993's A Dangerous Woman (along with sister Maggie), in "Bop Gun", a 1994 episode of Homicide: Life on the Street; and in the 1998 comedy Homegrown. Along with their mother, Jake and Maggie appeared in two episodes of Molto Mario, an Italian cooking show on the Food Network. Prior to his senior year in high school, the only other film not directed by his father in which Gyllenhaal was allowed to perform was the 1993 film Josh and S.A.M., a little-known children's adventure.

His parents insisted that he have summer jobs to support himself, and he thus worked as a lifeguard and as a busboy at a restaurant operated by a family friend. Gyllenhaal said his parents encouraged artistic expression: "I do have parents who constantly supported me in certain ways. In other ways, they were lacking. Definitely, it's in expression and creativity where my family has always been best at." Gyllenhaal graduated from the Harvard-Westlake School in Los Angeles in 1998, then attended Columbia University, where his sister was a senior and from which his mother had graduated, to study Eastern religions and philosophy. At Columbia, he was a resident of John Jay Hall. Gyllenhaal dropped out after two years to concentrate on acting but has expressed intentions to eventually finish his degree. Gyllenhaal's first lead role was in October Sky, Joe Johnston's 1999 adaptation of the Homer Hickam autobiography Rocket Boys, in which he portrayed a young man from West Virginia striving to win a science scholarship to avoid becoming a coal miner. The film was positively received and earned $32 million; it was described in the Sacramento News and Review as Gyllenhaal's "breakout performance".

2001–2004: Donnie Darko to the London stage
Donnie Darko, in which Gyllenhaal played his second lead role on film, was not a box office success upon its initial 2001 release but eventually became a cult favorite. Gyllenhaal's performance was well received by critics; Gary Mairs of Culture Vulture wrote that he "manages the difficult trick of seeming both blandly normal and profoundly disturbed, often within the same scene."

After the critical success of Donnie Darko, Gyllenhaal's next role was as Pilot Kelston in 2002's Highway alongside Jared Leto. His performance was described by one critic as "silly, clichéd and straight to video". Gyllenhaal had more success starring opposite Jennifer Aniston in The Good Girl, which premiered at the 2002 Sundance Film Festival; he also starred in Lovely and Amazing with Catherine Keener. In both films he plays an unstable character who begins a reckless affair with an older woman. Gyllenhaal later described these as "teenager in transition" roles. Gyllenhaal later starred in the Touchstone Pictures romantic comedy Bubble Boy, which was loosely based on the story of David Vetter. The film portrays the title character's adventures as he pursues the love of his life before she marries the wrong man. The film was panned by critics, with one calling it "stupid and devoid of any redeeming features".

Following Bubble Boy, Gyllenhaal starred opposite Dustin Hoffman, Susan Sarandon and Ellen Pompeo in Moonlight Mile (2002), as a young man coping with the death of his fiancée and the grief of her parents. The story, which received mixed reviews, is loosely based on writer-director Brad Silberling's personal experiences following the murder of his girlfriend, Rebecca Schaeffer. In his theatrical debut, Gyllenhaal starred on the London stage in Kenneth Lonergan's revival of This Is Our Youth at the Garrick Theatre in 2002. Gyllenhaal said, "Every actor I look up to has done theatre work, so I knew I had to give it a try." The play ran for eight weeks in London's West End; Gyllenhaal received favorable reviews and an Evening Standard Theatre Award in the Outstanding Newcomer category.

Gyllenhaal was almost cast as Spider-Man for 2004's Spider-Man 2, due to director Sam Raimi's concerns about original Spider-Man star Tobey Maguire's health. Maguire recovered, however, and the sequel was shot without Gyllenhaal. The two actors later starred in Brothers (2009) together, and resemble each other enough that Gyllenhaal has jokingly complained about cab drivers often calling him "Spider-Man." In 2003, he also auditioned for the role of Batman in the superhero film Batman Begins and came close being offered the part, but the role was given to Christian Bale. Instead, Gyllenhaal appeared in the science fiction blockbuster The Day After Tomorrow in 2004, co-starring Dennis Quaid as his father.

2005–2011: Brokeback Mountain and leading roles

In 2005, Gyllenhaal was cast in the drama Proof, with co-stars Gwyneth Paltrow and Anthony Hopkins, where he played a graduate student in mathematics who tries to convince Paltrow's character to publish a revolutionary proof to a problem puzzling the mathematicians' community. The film received a generally positive response. He also starred in Sam Mendes' Jarhead, where Gyllenhaal played a violent U.S. Marine during the first Gulf War. The film garnered a favorable response; Stephen Hunter of The Washington Post praises Gyllenhaal's performance, writing, "He makes us see his character's intelligence", adding "he doesn't seem jealous of the camera's attention when it goes to others".

In Brokeback Mountain (2005), Gyllenhaal and Heath Ledger play young men who meet as sheep herders and embark upon a sexual relationship that begins in the summer of 1963 and lasts for 20 years. The film was often referred to in the media with the shorthand phrase "the gay cowboy movie", although there was differing opinion on the sexual orientation of the characters. The film won numerous accolades, including the Golden Lion prize at the Venice Film Festival. The film won three Academy Awards, and earned Gyllenhaal a nomination for Best Supporting Actor, but he lost to George Clooney for Syriana. The film also won four Golden Globes, and four British Academy Film Awards (BAFTAs), in which Gyllenhaal won for Best Supporting Actor. He and Ledger won an MTV Movie Award for Best Kiss in 2006. Shortly after the 2006 Academy Awards, Gyllenhaal was invited to join the Academy in recognition of his acting career.

Gyllenhaal expressed mixed feelings about the experience of being directed by Ang Lee in Brokeback Mountain but generally had more praise than criticism for his directorial style. While critical of the way Lee tended to disconnect from his actors once filming began, Gyllenhaal praised his encouraging direction of the actors and sensitive approach to the material. At the Directors Guild of America Awards on January 28, 2006, Gyllenhaal also praised Lee for "his humbleness and his respect for everyone around him". When asked about his kissing scenes with Ledger in Brokeback Mountain, Gyllenhaal said, "As an actor, I think we need to embrace the times we feel most uncomfortable." When asked about the more intimate scenes with Ledger, Gyllenhaal likened them to "doing a sex scene with a woman I'm not particularly attracted to". Following the release of Brokeback Mountain, rumors circulated regarding the actor's sexual orientation. When asked about such gossip during an interview, Gyllenhaal said: 

Gyllenhaal narrated the 2005 short animated film The Man Who Walked Between the Towers, based on Mordicai Gerstein's book of the same name about Philippe Petit's famous stunt. In January 2007, as host of Saturday Night Live, he put on a sparkly evening dress and sang "And I Am Telling You I'm Not Going" from the musical Dreamgirls for his opening monologue, dedicating the song to his "unique fan base... the fans of Brokeback". Later, Gyllenhaal starred in David Fincher's mystery thriller Zodiac (2007), based on the Zodiac killer. He played Robert Graysmith, a San Francisco Chronicle political cartoonist. In preparation for his role, Gyllenhaal met Graysmith, and videotaped him to study his mannerisms and behavior. The film received a positive response; writing for The Sydney Morning Herald, Paul Byrnes opined that it was "poignant, provocative and haunting", and called Gyllenhaal "terrific". He next starred opposite Meryl Streep, Alan Arkin and Reese Witherspoon in 2007's Rendition, a Gavin Hood-directed political thriller about the U.S. policy of extraordinary rendition. Although it garnered a mixed response, New York magazine's David Edelstein called Gyllenhaal "compelling ... he's a reticent actor. But he builds that limitation into the character". Two years later, he co-starred with Tobey Maguire and Natalie Portman in Jim Sheridan's Brothers, a 2009 remake of Susanne Bier's Danish film of the same name. It was met with mixed reviews and moderate box office returns, but Anthony Quinn of The Independent thought Gyllenhaal and Maguire gave "honest performances". Gyllenhaal has also claimed that Maguire's performance in the film influenced his acting throughout his career.

The following year, Gyllenhaal played the lead role in Prince of Persia: The Sands of Time, an adaptation of the video game of the same name, produced by Jerry Bruckheimer and released by Disney. He starred opposite Anne Hathaway in the romantic-comedy Love & Other Drugs, released on November 24, 2010, which gained him a Golden Globe Award nomination. The Guardian Philip French welcomed Gyllenhaal's choice of a comic role, in contrast to his previous film roles, but thought the film "stumbles badly". For his sole project in 2011, he portrayed Colter Stevens, a U.S. Army Aviation captain, in the 2011 time-travel thriller Source Code. Despite noting the film's unrealistic plot, Peter Howell of the Toronto Star praised the prime performances of the cast.

2012–2018: Critical acclaim and Broadway debut
Gyllenhaal starred alongside Michael Peña in David Ayer's action thriller End of Watch, about two Los Angeles street cops. The film, for which Gyllenhaal was also an executive producer, was released in September 2012 and received positive reviews, with Roger Ebert deeming it "one of the best police movies in recent years, a virtuoso fusion of performances and often startling action" and Salons Andrew O'Hehir stating that the film was "at least the best cop movie since James Gray's We Own the Night, and very likely since Antoine Fuqua's memorable Training Day (which, not coincidentally, was written by Ayer)". To prepare for the role, Gyllenhaal took tactical training and participated in actual police drives with co-star Peña to help establish the language of the characters.

He served as a jury member for the 62nd Berlin International Film Festival that was held in February 2012. Also in 2012, Gyllenhaal made his Off-Broadway debut in Nick Payne's play If There Is I Haven't Found It Yet at the Roundabout Theatre Company's Laura Pels Theatre. 2013 saw Gyllenhaal appear in two films directed by Denis Villeneuve, whom Gyllenhaal describes as "an older brother". The first, the thriller Prisoners, starred Gyllenhaal as a detective named Loki in search of the abductor of two young girls. Rolling Stone critic Peter Travers praised Gyllenhaal's "exceptional" performance in the film. In their second collaboration, Gyllenhaal portrayed the dual role of a history teacher and his doppelgänger in the thriller Enemy. The following year, he produced and starred in the crime thriller Nightcrawler, earning Golden Globe Award and Screen Actors Guild Award nominations for his performance. Ben Sachs of the Chicago Reader called Gyllenhaal's performance "attention-grabbing" and said that he "creates a memorable screen presence".

Gyllenhaal debuted on Broadway in Payne's Constellations at the Samuel J. Friedman Theatre opposite Ruth Wilson, also in her Broadway debut. The production opened in January 2015 and closed in March of the same year. That same year, he starred in the comedy Accidental Love, which was filmed in South Carolina with Jessica Biel, as well as Antoine Fuqua's sports drama Southpaw. Writing for The Independent, Geoffrey Macnab called his portrayal of a boxer in Southpaw "plausible" and complimented his "emotional vulnerability", despite an unoriginal plot. He then portrayed American mountaineer Scott Fischer in Baltasar Kormákur's Everest, based on the 1996 Mount Everest disaster; the film was a commercial success, grossing $203 million worldwide. Finally, he appeared in Jean-Marc Vallée's comedy-drama Demolition, playing an investment banker Davis Mitchell, who rebuilds his life after losing his wife. The Village Voices Bilge Ebiri praised his performance, writing, "He nails Davis's boyish curiosity, the quiet, wide-eyed uncertainty of someone discovering the world for the first time." He also served as a jury member for the main competition of the 2015 Cannes Film Festival.

In 2016, he starred in Tom Ford's neo-noir thriller Nocturnal Animals, based on the 1993 novel Tony and Susan by Austin Wright. The film received positive reviews; The Sydney Morning Heralds Sandra Hall praised Gyllenhaal's brilliant portrayal of his two roles, while Justin Chang of the Los Angeles Times wrote that his performance contained "rich emotional shadings" and escalating intensity that becomes overwhelming. In October 2016, he appeared in four benefit concert performances of the Stephen Sondheim and James Lapine musical Sunday in the Park with George at the New York City Center as the titular character. Alexis Soloski of The Guardian gave the performance a perfect five-star review and hailed Gyllenhaal's superb singing. Starting in February 2017, Gyllenhaal reprised the role at the reopened Hudson Theatre on Broadway. Ben Brantley of The New York Times praised his "searing theatrical presence, in which his eyes are his center of gravity." He was scheduled to appear in Lanford Wilson's Burn This on Broadway under the direction of Michael Mayer in 2017. However, a new production of Burn This took place in 2019 with Adam Driver appearing, with Gyllenhaal's production having reportedly been abandoned.

In 2017, Gyllenhaal starred as astronaut David Jordan in the science fiction horror film Life; Slant Magazines Eric Henderson stated that Gyllenhaal was "dead behind the eyes from his first scene". He also had a supporting role in the action-adventure film Okja and starred in the drama Stronger, based on Boston Marathon bombing survivor Jeff Bauman. In his review of the latter, The Independents Geoffrey Macnab complimented Gyllenhaal's versatility and "outstanding" portrayal of Bauman. The following year, he co-starred in the drama Wildlife opposite Carey Mulligan, in which he plays a father who temporarily abandons his family to take a dangerous job. It is based on the 1990 novel of the same name by Richard Ford. Ella Kemp, writing for Sight & Sound magazine, praised the chemistry of the lead actors which "fizzes with an effortless dynamism". He also had a role in the western drama The Sisters Brothers (2018).

2019–present: Action and thriller films
Gyllenhaal reunited with Nightcrawler director Dan Gilroy in the thriller film Velvet Buzzsaw, in which he plays art critic Mort Vandewalt. The film premiered at the 2019 Sundance Film Festival and was distributed by Netflix. Varietys Peter Debrudge opined that Gyllenhaal was "relishing another of those cartoonishly camp performances". That same year, Gyllenhaal played comic book villain Mysterio / Quentin Beck in the superhero film Spider-Man: Far From Home, a sequel to Spider-Man: Homecoming, set within the Marvel Cinematic Universe. It was one of the highest-grossing films of the year. He appeared alongside Tom Sturridge in Sea Wall/A Life, a double bill of monologues by Nick Payne and Simon Stephens, at the Hudson Theatre on Broadway  in 2019. He garnered a Tony Award nomination for Best Actor in a Play for his performance. Gyllenhaal also lent his voice for the animation Spirit Untamed (2021). That same year, he played detective Joe Baylor in the crime thriller The Guilty, a remake of the Danish film of the same name. 

In 2022, he starred as a criminal in Michael Bay's action thriller Ambulance; the film received mixed reviews from critics. Gyllenhaal also voiced a farmer in the Disney animation Strange World. He will next star in Guy Ritchie's The Covenant and in Doug Liman's action film Road House.

Media image
Gyllenhaal was named one of People magazine's "50 Most Beautiful People" in 2006. He was also listed in People's "Hottest Bachelors of 2006". In April 2012, Shalom Life ranked him number six on its list of "the 50 most talented, intelligent, funny, and gorgeous Jewish men in the world". He was ranked number 35 in Empire magazine's poll of The 100 Sexiest Movie Stars in 2013. In another poll conducted by Glamour magazine, Gyllenhaal was selected as one of the Sexiest Men of The Year 2018.

Personal life

Family and relationships

Gyllenhaal's sister Maggie is married to actor Peter Sarsgaard, Gyllenhaal's co-star in Jarhead and Rendition. In December 2006, Gyllenhaal and his sister escaped a fire that destroyed Manka's Inverness Lodge, a famed lodge and restaurant in Inverness, California, at which they were vacationing. The two were among a dozen or so guests who fled after the fire, sparked by a falling tree, broke out at about 3 a.m. Co-owner and celebrity chef Daniel DeLong said the pair were supportive despite having to brave the wind and cold. "Jake was helping me pull things out of the fire" DeLong said.

Gyllenhaal has both godparents and what he describes as "celebrity godparents". Actor and director Paul Newman was his godfather, and actress Jamie Lee Curtis is his godmother. Other godparents of unknown status include a gay couple and cinematographer Robert Elswit. Gyllenhaal is the godfather of Matilda Rose Ledger (born October 28, 2005), daughter of his Brokeback Mountain co-stars Heath Ledger and Michelle Williams.

Gyllenhaal began dating actress Kirsten Dunst in 2002 after his sister Maggie, who starred with Dunst in Mona Lisa Smile, introduced them; they eventually broke up in 2004 on friendly terms. He dated his Rendition co-star Reese Witherspoon from 2007 until 2009. He dated singer-songwriter Taylor Swift from October 2010 to January 2011, and model Alyssa Miller from July to December 2013. 

Gyllenhaal has been in a relationship with French model Jeanne Cadieu since late 2018.

Politics and other interests
Gyllenhaal once filmed a commercial for Rock the Vote and, along with his sister, visited the University of Southern California to urge students to vote in the 2004 presidential election. He also campaigned for Democratic presidential nominee John Kerry. He has said, however, that "it frustrates me when actors talk politics; I'm political and I make choices in my movies that I think are political. I try and say things with what I do. Rightly or wrongly, young actors have all the power." In an interview, he remarked that "it's a sad time when actors are politicians and politicians are actors". In the 2018 midterm elections, Gyllenhaal endorsed Senate candidate Beto O'Rourke. His endorsement came in the form of a Facebook post that included a picture of him in a "BETO" shirt and lengthy caption that also endorsed Stacey Abrams, Andrew Gillum, Kyrsten Sinema, and Jacky Rosen in their respective Senate or gubernatorial elections.

Gyllenhaal recycles regularly, and said in an interview that he spends $400 a year to have trees planted in a Mozambique forest, partly to promote the Future Forests program. After filming The Day After Tomorrow, he flew to the Arctic to promote awareness of climate change. He has described climate activist Greta Thunberg as an inspiring figure.

In 2003, Gyllenhaal participated in an advertising campaign by the American Civil Liberties Union. Gyllenhaal is the Honorary Chair of the New Eyes for the Needy Advisory Board, and has signed on to help the TV fundraiser Stand Up to Cancer. Gyllenhaal is on the board of directors for the Anti-Recidivism Coalition and volunteered in California juvenile detention centers with Scott Budnick. In 2014, Gyllenhaal attended an event that benefited the Headstrong Project, an organization that provides treatment to military veterans suffering from post traumatic stress disorder, during which he read a poem by a veteran, and in 2017 he participated in a fundraiser to help survivors who lost limbs during the September 11 attacks in 2001.

Gyllenhaal has studied Buddhism, and has said, "I am not a card-carrying Buddhist, but I do try to practice mindfulness" and that it is his goal to meditate every day.

Acting credits and awards

Gyllenhaal's most acclaimed films, according to the review aggregate site Rotten Tomatoes, include October Sky (1999), Donnie Darko (2001), Lovely & Amazing (2002), Brokeback Mountain (2005), Zodiac (2007), Source Code (2011), End of Watch (2012), Nightcrawler (2014), and Stronger (2017). He has been nominated for an Academy Award, two Golden Globe Awards, three British Academy Film Awards, and three Screen Actors Guild Awards.

References

External links

 
 
 
 
 

1980 births
20th-century American male actors
21st-century American male actors
American male child actors
American male film actors
American male television actors
American male voice actors
American male stage actors
American people of English descent
American people of Polish-Jewish descent
American people of Russian-Jewish descent
American people of Swedish descent
Best Supporting Actor BAFTA Award winners
Columbia College (New York) alumni
Jake
Harvard-Westlake School alumni
Jewish American male actors
Living people
Male actors from Los Angeles
21st-century American Jews
American Ashkenazi Jews